Thomas or Tom Stapleton may refer to:
Thomas Stapleton (theologian) (1535–1598), English Catholic controversialist
Thomas Stapleton (antiquary) (1805–1849), English landowner
Tom Stapleton (footballer) (1907–1977), Australian rules footballer
Thomas Stapleton (paediatrician) (1920-2007), British physician who worked in Australia
Thomas J. Stapleton (born 1947), Democratic member of the Pennsylvania House of Representatives
Thomas Stapleton (hurler) (born 1988), Irish hurler
Tom Stapleton (hurler), Irish athlete in the 1880s

See also 
Stapleton baronets